Adrienne Davies is the current drummer and percussionist of the drone metal band Earth.

Davies is credited as drummer on several of Earth's albums. They range from Living in the Gleam of an Unsheathed Sword (2005) and for drums, percussion, and wind chimes on Hex (Or Printing in the Infernal Method) (2005). She has since played on its album Hibernaculum, as well as Altar—the Sunn O))) and Boris collaboration—which also features other members of Earth. She was also the drummer for their most recent album, Full Upon Her Burning Lips, released in 2019.

Davies has stated that she was a fan of Earth before her debut. Her drumming style was heavily influenced by Dylan Carlson's pioneering drone metal sound with Michael McDaniel as the band's drummer in the 1990s. Some of her other influences include Jim Keltner, Tony Williams, and Jack DeJohnette.

Discography (partial)

 2003 070796 Live
 2005 Living in the Gleam of an Unsheathed Sword
 2005 Hex (Or Printing in the Infernal Method)
 2006 Altar
 2007 Hibernaculum
 2008 The Bees Made Honey in the Lion's Skull
 2011 Angels of Darkness, Demons of Light I
 2012 Angels of Darkness, Demons of Light II
 2014 Primitive and Deadly

References

External links

Living people
American heavy metal drummers
American women drummers
Year of birth missing (living people)
Earth (American band) members
21st-century American women
Women in metal